The Rush River is a  river in the U.S. state of Virginia. It rises in the northern part of Shenandoah National Park and flows southeast to the Thornton River at Rock Mills.  Via the Thornton and Hazel rivers, it is part of the Rappahannock River watershed.

See also
List of rivers of Virginia

References

USGS Hydrologic Unit Map - State of Virginia (1974)

Rivers of Virginia
Tributaries of the Rappahannock River
Shenandoah National Park
Rivers of Rappahannock County, Virginia